Bithynian coinage refers to coinage struck by the Kingdom of Bithynia that was situated on the coast of the Black Sea.

Extent of monetization
Asia Minor is known for having kingdoms that issued abundant coinage during some points in their history. After Pergamon under the Attalid dynasty expanded, smaller kingdoms exploited the political situation and increased their power in the region. Bithynia, Cappadocia and Pontus are well-known and studied for their abundant coinage at certain times. Bithynian kingdom incorporated the most monetized areas under its domain when compared to the other two kingdoms. Bithynian rulers struck long and continuous series of silver and bronze coinage. Elsewhere, Cappadocians are primarily known for their military issues of coins, and the less monetized Pontic region primarily struck bronze coinage.

The purpose of the first royal Bithynian and Cappadocian bronze coinage is still unknown.

History
The first king was Zipoetes I c. 298 BC – c. 279 BC. It is thought that there were no coinage struck during his reign.

The first Bithynian king to strike coins was Nicomedes I (c. 280 BC – c. 250 BC). He is primarily known for bringing the Gauls known as Galatians to the Asia Minor in 277 BC to fight against his brother and Antiochus I. This short-sighted mistake brought troubles for local Greeks for a century. In early 260s BC, possibly in 264 BC according to Eusebius, he moved the capital to Nicomedia on the Propontis. There was a mint in the new capital. Silver tetradrachms and drachms of the Attic weight are known. Nicomedes I is known to have struck some bronze coinage too. Both Bithynian and Cappadocian coinages were started with minor series of bronze coins.

Successor of Nicomedes I was Ziaelas (c. 250 BC – 230 BC). He is known for having minted bronze coinage. However, only a few specimen have survived.

Reign of Prusias I (c. 232 BC – 182 BC) saw birth of a more regular silver and bronze coinage for the kingdom. The first large issues of coins can be thus attributed to him. Bronze coinage of Prusias I and Prusias II have not been differentiated in the most common catalogues. However, those related to Ziaelas can be attributed to Prusias I.

Nicomedes II is notable for having struck the first gold staters in the kingdom's history. Those coins had his portrait on their obverse, and a galloping horseman on the reverse. He also introduced the year number of the Bithynian era on his coins, replacing the Seleucid era.

Both Nicomedes III and Nicomedes IV struck similar tetradrachms as their predecessor Nicomedes II.

End of the kingdom

On the death of king Nicomedes IV in 74 BC the kingdom was bequeathed to the Roman Empire, and subsequently reconstituted as a Roman province. It was later part of the province of the Bithynia and Pontus. Roman administration saw introduction of a new provincial currency, and Bithynian polity's capital was moved back to Nicomedia.

During Roman rule the provincial cities that, in the combined province of Bithynia and Pontus, issued coinage reached 29 cities during the second century AD. Some of these cities on the Bithynian region included Apamea Myrlea, Bithynium, Nicaea, Nicomedia and Tium.

See also
List of rulers of Bithynia
Pontic coinage

References

Further reading

External links

"Ancient Coinage of Bithynia, Nicomedia"

Ancient currencies
Hellenistic Bithynia